The largehead hairtail (Trichiurus lepturus) or beltfish is a member of the cutlassfish family, Trichiuridae. This common to abundant species is found in tropical and temperate oceans throughout the world. The taxonomy is not fully resolved, and the Atlantic, East Pacific and Northwest Pacific populations are also known as Atlantic cutlassfish, Pacific cutlassfish and Japanese cutlassfish, respectively. This predatory, elongated fish supports major fisheries.

Appearance
Largehead hairtails are silvery steel blue in color, turning silvery gray after death. The fins are generally semi-transparent and may have a yellowish tinge. Largehead hairtails are elongated in shape with a thin pointed tail (they lack a fish tail in the usual form). The eyes are large, and the large mouth contains long pointed fang-like teeth.

Range and habitat 
Largehead hairtails are found worldwide in tropical and temperate oceans. In the East Atlantic they range from southern United Kingdom to South Africa, including the Mediterranean Sea. In the West Atlantic it ranges from Virginia (occasionally Cape Cod) to northern Argentina, including the Caribbean Sea and Gulf of Mexico. In the East Pacific they range from southern California to Peru. Widespread in the Indo-Pacific region, ranging from the Red Sea to South Africa, Japan, the entire coast of Australia (except Tasmania and Victoria) and Fiji, they are absent from the central Pacific Ocean, including Hawaii. Some populations are migratory.

It is absent from waters below . They are mainly benthopelagic, but may appear at the surface during the night.

Taxonomy 

Although often considered a single highly widespread species, it has been argued that it is a species complex that includes several species with the main groups being in the Atlantic (Atlantic cutlassfish), East Pacific (Pacific cutlassfish), Northwest Pacific (Japanese cutlassfish) and Indo-Pacific. If split, the Atlantic would retain the scientific name T. lepturus, as the type locality is off South Carolina. The Northwest Pacific (Sea of Japan and East China Sea) differs in morphometrics, meristics and genetics, and is sometimes recognized as T. japonicus. Morphometric and meristic differences have also been shown in the population of the East Pacific (California to Peru), leading some to recognize it as T. nitens. Neither T. japonicus nor T. nitens are recognized as separate species by FishBase where considered synonyms of T. lepturus, but they are recognized as separate species by the Catalog of Fishes. The IUCN recognizes the East Atlantic population as a distinct, currently undescribed species. This is based on genetic evidence showing a divergence between West and East Atlantic populations. However, this would require that T. japonicus, T. nitens and the Indo-Pacific populations also are recognized as separate species, effectively limiting T. lepturus to the West Atlantic (contrary to IUCN), as they all show a greater divergence.

Additional studies are required on the possible separation and nomenclature of the Indo-Pacific populations. Based on studies of mtDNA, which however lacked any samples from the southern parts of the Pacific and Indian Oceans, there are three species in the Indo-Pacific: T. japonicus (marginal in the region, see range above), T. lepturus (West Pacific and Eastern Indian Ocean; the species also found in the Atlantic) and the final preliminarily referred to as Trichiurus sp. 2 (Indian Ocean, and East and South China Seas). It is likely that Trichiurus sp. 2 equals T. nanhaiensis. The names T. coxii and T. haumela have been used for the populations off Australia and in the Indo-Pacific, respectively, but firm evidence supporting their validity as species is lacking.

Behavior and life cycle

Juveniles participate in the diel vertical migration, rising to feed on krill and small fish during the night and returning to the sea bed in the day. This movement pattern is reversed by large adults, which mainly feed on fish. Other known prey items include squid and shrimp, and the highly carnivorous adults regularly cannibalise younger individuals. Largehead hairtails are often found in large, dense schools.

Consequently, spawning is year-round in tropical regions, but generally in the spring and summer in colder regions. Through a spawning season each female lays many thousand pelagic eggs that hatch after three to six days. In the Sea of Japan most individuals reach maturity when two years old, but some already after one year. The oldest recorded age is 15 years.

Fisheries and usage
Largehead hairtail is a major commercial species. With reported landings of more than 1.3 million tonnes in 2009, it was the sixth most important captured fish species. The species is caught throughout much of its range, typically by bottom trawls or beach seines, but also using a wide range of other methods. In 2009, by far the largest catches (1.2 million tonnes) were reported by China and Taiwan from the Northwest Pacific (FAO Fishing Area 61). The next largest catches were reported from South Korea, Japan, and Pakistan. Some of the numerous other countries where regularly caught include Angola, Nigeria, Senegal, Mauritania, Morocco, Brazil, Trinidad, Colombia, Mexico, southeastern United States, Iran, India, and Australia.

In Korea, the largehead hairtail is called galchi, in which gal came from Middle Korean galh meaning "sword" and -chi is a suffix for "fish". It is popular for frying or grilling. In Japan, where it is known as tachiuo (" (tachi)": sword, " (uo)":fish), they are fished for food and eaten grilled or raw, as sashimi. They are also called "sword-fish" in Portugal and Brazil (peixe-espada), where they are eaten grilled or fried. Its flesh is firm yet tender when cooked, with a moderate level of "fishiness" to the smell and a low level of oiliness. The largehead hairtail is also notable for being fairly easy to debone.

References

External links

 

largehead hairtail
Fish of the Atlantic Ocean
Fish of the Pacific Ocean
Fish of Japan
Cosmopolitan fish
largehead hairtail
largehead hairtail